Scott Drew Ruskin (born June 8, 1963) is an American former professional baseball player who was a pitcher for four Major League Baseball seasons.

Career
Ruskin was born in Jacksonville, Florida.  He attended Sandalwood High School in Jacksonville, and played high school baseball for the Sandalwood Saints.

Ruskin received an athletic scholarship to attend the University of Florida in Gainesville, Florida, where he played for coach Joe Arnold's Florida Gators baseball team from 1982 to 1985. In 1983, he played collegiate summer baseball with the Falmouth Commodores of the Cape Cod Baseball League. He received All-Southeastern conference (SEC) honors in 1984 and 1985 and was a second-team All-American in 1984.  Ruskin returned to the university after his professional baseball career was over, and completed his bachelor's degree in computer and information science in 2003.

See also 

 Florida Gators
 List of Florida Gators baseball players
 List of University of Florida alumni

References

External links 

1963 births
Living people
American expatriate baseball players in Canada
Baseball players from Jacksonville, Florida
Cincinnati Reds players
Falmouth Commodores players
Florida Gators baseball players
Gulf Coast Pirates players
Harrisburg Senators players
Indianapolis Indians players
Macon Pirates players
Major League Baseball pitchers
Montreal Expos players
Pittsburgh Pirates players
Salem Buccaneers players
Sandalwood High School alumni